The A 16 road is an A-Grade trunk road in Sri Lanka. It connects Beragala with Hali Ela.

The A 16 passes through Bandarawela and Demodara to reach Hali Ela.

References

Highways in Sri Lanka